Edgar George Clough (October 28, 1906 – January 30, 1944) was an outfielder and pitcher in Major League Baseball. He played for the St. Louis Cardinals.

References

External links

1906 births
1944 deaths
Major League Baseball outfielders
Major League Baseball pitchers
St. Louis Cardinals players
Akron Tyrites players
Baseball players from Pennsylvania
Scottdale Scotties players
Dayton Aviators players